Gérard Rué (born 7 July 1965 in Romillé) is a French former road cyclist. He was a professional from 1987 to 1996.

Career
Rué began his professional career in 1987 with the  Système U–Gitane team. In 1993, he transferred to the Banesto team to support Miguel Induráin and Pedro Delgado.

Known for being one of the most important teammates of Miguel Induráin in the Banesto team, he also won several races and some places of honor in the classics.

Major results

1987
 1st Duo Normand (with Thierry Marie)
 1st Prologue Tour de la Communauté Européenne (TTT)
 2nd Points race, National Track Championships
 2nd Grand Prix d'Isbergues
 6th Overall Circuit Cycliste Sarthe
1988
 1st Stage 7 Grand Prix du Midi Libre
 2nd Grand Prix de Plumelec-Morbihan
 2nd Overall Tour de la Communauté Européenne
1989
 1st Tour du Haut-Var
 1st Stage 6 Critérium du Dauphiné Libéré
 1st Stage 2 Tour de France (TTT)
 2nd Overall Grand Prix du Midi Libre
 5th Overall Paris–Nice
1st Stage 5
 8th Milan–San Remo
1990
 1st  Overall Tour Méditerranéen
 1st  Overall Grand Prix du Midi Libre
 1st Grand Prix de Cannes
 9th Overall Tour of the Netherlands
1991
 2nd Overall Critérium International
 2nd La Poly Normande
 3rd Road race, National Road Championships
 3rd Tre Valli Varesine
 3rd Trofeo Laigueglia
 6th Milan–San Remo
 7th Overall Tirreno–Adriatico
1st Stage 5
 10th Overall Tour de France
1992
 1st Tour du Haut-Var
 1st Stage 5 Tour of the Netherlands
 2nd La Flèche Wallonne
 2nd Overall Giro di Puglia
 6th Liège–Bastogne–Liège
1993
 1st Boucles de l'Aulne
 1st Stage 1 Vuelta a los Valles Mineros
 2nd La Flèche Wallonne
 2nd Bol d'Or des Monédières
 8th Road race, World Road Championships
1994
 8th Amstel Gold Race
1995
 2nd Classique des Alpes
 3rd Châteauroux Classic
 7th Overall Circuit Cycliste Sarthe
1996
 2nd Bordeaux–Caudéran
 3rd Paris–Bourges
 7th Overall Tour du Limousin
 7th Overall Circuit Cycliste Sarthe
 8th Route Adélie
 10th Veenendaal–Veenendaal
1997
 4th Route Adélie
 9th Overall Étoile de Bessèges

Grand Tour general classification results timeline

References

1965 births
Living people
French male cyclists